"Echo of Me" is a song by the British band Palm Springs. It was included as the A-side of a 7" single, and was the second single to be released by the band on their Random Acts of Vinyl label.

Accolades 
Wolfgang Doebling, the editor of German Rolling Stone placed the "Echo of Me" single at the top of his playlist in December 2005. He also positioned the song at number four in his list of “Best Singles 2005” on his Roots show for Berlin’s Radio Eins.

2005 singles
Palm Springs (band) songs
2005 songs